The 2003 Sirius Satellite Radio at The Glen was the 22nd stock car race of the 2003 NASCAR Winston Cup Series season and the 18th iteration of the event. The race was held on Sunday, August 10, 2003, before a crowd of 100,000 at the shortened layout of Watkins Glen International, a 2.454 miles (3.949 km) permanent road course. The race took the scheduled 90 laps to complete. At race's end, Robby Gordon of Richard Childress Racing would stretch out a fuel run in the last 39 laps of the race to win his third and final career NASCAR Winston Cup Series win and his second and final win of the season. To fill out the podium, Scott Pruett of Chip Ganassi Racing and Dale Earnhardt Jr. of Dale Earnhardt Jr. would finish second and third, respectively.

Background 

Watkins Glen International (nicknamed "The Glen") is an automobile race track located in Watkins Glen, New York at the southern tip of Seneca Lake. It was long known around the world as the home of the Formula One United States Grand Prix, which it hosted for twenty consecutive years (1961–1980), but the site has been home to road racing of nearly every class, including the World Sportscar Championship, Trans-Am, Can-Am, NASCAR Sprint Cup Series, the International Motor Sports Association and the IndyCar Series.

Initially, public roads in the village were used for the race course. In 1956 a permanent circuit for the race was built. In 1968 the race was extended to six hours, becoming the 6 Hours of Watkins Glen. The circuit's current layout has more or less been the same since 1971, although a chicane was installed at the uphill Esses in 1975 to slow cars through these corners, where there was a fatality during practice at the 1973 United States Grand Prix. The chicane was removed in 1985, but another chicane called the "Inner Loop" was installed in 1992 after J.D. McDuffie's fatal accident during the previous year's NASCAR Winston Cup event.

The circuit is known as the Mecca of North American road racing and is a very popular venue among fans and drivers. The facility is currently owned by International Speedway Corporation.

Entry list

Practice

First practice 
The first practice session was held on Friday, August 8, at 11:00 AM EST, and would last for 2 hours.

Second practice 
The second practice session was held on Saturday, August 9, at 9:30 AM EST, and would last for 45 minutes.

Third and final practice 
The third and final practice session, sometimes referred to as Happy Hour, was held on Saturday, August 9, at 11:10 AM EST, and would last for 45 minutes.

Qualifying 
Qualifying was held on Friday, August 8, at 3:05 PM EST. Drivers would each have one lap to set a lap time. Positions 1-36 would be decided on time, while positions 37-43 would be based on provisionals. Six spots are awarded by the use of provisionals based on owner's points. The seventh is awarded to a past champion who has not otherwise qualified for the race. If no past champ needs the provisional, the next team in the owner points will be awarded a provisional.

Four drivers would fail to qualify: Ken Schrader, Joe Varde, Scott Maxwell, and Larry Foyt.

Full qualifying results

Race results

References 

2003 NASCAR Winston Cup Series
NASCAR races at Watkins Glen International
August 2003 sports events in the United States
2003 in sports in New York (state)